Federal Highway 119D is a toll highway connecting Tejocotal, Hidalgo to Tlaxco Municipality, Tlaxcala. The road is operated by Promotora y Operadora de Infraestructura S.A. de C.V. (PINFRA).

References 

Mexican Federal Highways